

Championships

World Championships
Men Yugoslavia 64, Russia 62
Women USA 71, Russia 65

Professional
Men
1998 NBA Finals: Chicago Bulls over the Utah Jazz 4-2.  MVP: Michael Jordan
 1998 NBA Playoffs, 1997-98 NBA season, 1998 NBA draft, 1998 NBA All-Star Game
 Philippine Basketball Association 1998 season:
Alaska Milkmen over the San Miguel Beermen 4-3 in the All-Filipino Cup Finals
Alaska Milkmen over the San Miguel Beermen 4-2 in the Commissioner's Finals
Formula Shell Zoom Masters over the Mobiline Phone Pals 4-3 in the Governor's Finals
Women
WNBA Finals: Houston Comets over the Phoenix Mercury 2-1.  MVP: Cynthia Cooper
 1998 WNBA Playoffs, 1998 WNBA season, 1998 WNBA draft

College
Men
NCAA Division I: University of Kentucky 78, University of Utah 69
National Invitation Tournament: University of Minnesota def. Penn State University
NCAA Division II: University of California-Davis	83, Kentucky Wesleyan College 77
NCAA Division III: University of Wisconsin-Platteville 69, Hope College 53
NAIA Division I: Georgetown College (KY) 83, Southern Nazarene University (OK) 69
NAIA Division II: Bethel College (Indiana) (IN) 89, Oregon Institute of Technology 87
NJCAA Division I:   Indian Hills CC, Ottumwa, Iowa 83, Shelby State CC, Memphis, Tennessee 68
Women
NCAA Division I: Purdue University 62, Duke University 45
NCAA Division II: North Dakota State University 92, Emporia State University 76
NCAA Division III Washington (Mo.) 77, University of Southern Maine 69
NAIA Division I: Union College (TN) 73-70 Southern Nazarene University (OK) 70
NAIA Division II Walsh University (OH)) 73, University of Mary Hardin-Baylor (TX) 66

Preps
USA Today Boys Basketball #1 Ranking: St. John's at Prospect Hall, Frederick, Maryland (25-0) Led by Jason Capel and Damien Wilkins.
USA Today Girls Basketball #1 Ranking: Christ the King, Queens, New York (27-0)  Won the New York Federation Class A title, led by Sue Bird.

Awards and honors

Professional
Men
NBA Most Valuable Player Award:   Michael Jordan
NBA Rookie of the Year Award: Tim Duncan
NBA Defensive Player of the Year Award: Dikembe Mutombo
NBA Coach of the Year Award: Larry Bird, Indiana Pacers
Women
WNBA Most Valuable Player Award: Cynthia Cooper, Houston Comets
WNBA Defensive Player of the Year Award: Teresa Weatherspoon, New York Liberty
WNBA Rookie of the Year Award: Tracy Reid, Charlotte Sting
Kim Perrot Sportsmanship Award: Suzie McConnell Serio, Cleveland Rockers
WNBA Coach of the Year Award: Van Chancellor, Houston Comets
WNBA Finals Most Valuable Player Award: Cynthia Cooper, Houston Comets

Collegiate 
 Men
John R. Wooden Award: Antawn Jamison, North Carolina
Naismith College Coach of the Year: Bill Guthridge, North Carolina
Frances Pomeroy Naismith Award: Earl Boykins, Eastern Michigan
Associated Press College Basketball Player of the Year: Antawn Jamison, North Carolina
NCAA basketball tournament Most Outstanding Player: Richard Hamilton, Connecticut
USBWA National Freshman of the Year: Larry Hughes, Saint Louis
Associated Press College Basketball Coach of the Year: Tom Izzo, Michigan State
Naismith Outstanding Contribution to Basketball: Dean Smith
 Women
Naismith College Player of the Year: Chamique Holdsclaw, Tennessee
Naismith College Coach of the Year: Pat Summitt, Tennessee
Wade Trophy: Ticha Penicheiro, Old Dominion
Frances Pomeroy Naismith Award: Angie Arnold, Johns Hopkins
Associated Press Women's College Basketball Player of the Year: Chamique Holdsclaw, Tennessee
NCAA basketball tournament Most Outstanding Player: Chamique Holdsclaw, Tennessee
Basketball Academic All-America Team: Lisa Davies, Missouri State
Carol Eckman Award: Kay James, Southern Mississippi
Associated Press College Basketball Coach of the Year: Pat Summitt, Tennessee

Naismith Memorial Basketball Hall of Fame
Class of 1998:
 Larry Bird
 Jody Conradt
 Alex Hannum
 Marques Haynes
 Aleksandar Nikolić
 Arnie Risen
 Lenny Wilkens

Events

Movies
BASEketball
He Got Game

Deaths
 March 11 — Buddy Jeannette, Hall of Fame NBA, NBL and BAA player (born 1917)
 March 17 — Cliff Barker, American basketball player (born 1921)
 May 15 — Earl "Goat" Manigault, legendary street player (born 1944)
 June 8 — McCoy Ingram, 67, American player (Minneapolis Lakers, Harlem Globetrotters).
 July 4 — Jay Taylor, American NBA player (New Jersey Nets) (born 1967)
 August 8 — Sam Balter, member of 1936 US Olympic team (born 1909)
 November 6 — Jack Hartman, American Kansas State University coach (born 1925)
 November 6 — Fred Pralle, All-American college player (Kansas) (born 1916)
 November 13 — Red Holzman, American Basketball Hall of Fame coach who won two NBA championships with the New York Knicks (born 1920)
 December 6 — Radomir Shaper, Serbian player and administrator and FIBA Hall of Fame member (born 1925)

References